Lisa Cabrera (raised in Washington, Pennsylvania) is an American TV News Reporter and Host.

Life 
She is currently a freelance TV reporter and Host living in New York City with her husband and daughter.   Cabrera was formerly a fill-in Anchor and Reporter for FOX5 WNYW-TV in New York City.

Cabrera attended college at the University of Tampa, where she graduated with a Bachelor of Arts Degree in English and Writing.  Cabrera began her broadcasting career in  Colorado, where she served in positions like writer, photographer, editor, reporter and anchor for various stations including KJCT in Grand Junction and KOAA in Colorado Springs. From there, Cabrera took a reporting position in West Palm Beach, Florida where she was a reporter and fill-in anchor.  In February 1996, Cabrera joined as a reporter and fill-in anchor at NBC's WTMJ-TV in Milwaukee.

Lisa moved to Miami and in 1998 becoming the Entertainment Reporter for the now-defunct Barry Diller operation, WAMI-TV from April 1998-April 1999.  She also served as a co-host on a daily sports show broadcast live on South Beach.  She jumped to WFOR-TV CBS4 and UPN33 where she served as weekend anchor/reporter.

FOX5 WNYW brought Cabrera to New York in 2005. She served as a fill-in Anchor and Reporter.

On May 2, 2006, Cabrera was giving a live report from New York's Union Square, when a man walked behind her and dropped his pants.  Cabrera was unaware of what was going on and finished her live report, the man put his pants back on and left.

Cabrera left WNYW in the latter part of 2007 to start a family.

External links
 Fox 5 Bio
 Super-Hair.net City League Champions

American television journalists
American women television journalists
New York (state) television reporters
Television anchors from New York City
Living people
Year of birth missing (living people)
21st-century American women